The term Serbian Orthodox Church may refer to:

 Serbian Orthodox Church, Serbian branch of the Eastern Orthodox Church
 Serbian True Orthodox Church, non-canonical eastern-orthodox church in Serbia
 Free Serbian Orthodox Church, former non-canonical branch (1963-1991) of the Serbian Orthodox Church

See also 
 Serbian Church (disambiguation)
 Serbian Catholic Church